Tenías que ser tú (English title: Had to be you) is a Mexican telenovela produced by Carlos Téllez for Televisa in 1993.

Alejandra Ávalos and Chao starred as protagonists, while Mariana Garza, Héctor Cruz Lara, Luis Couturier and the leading actor Carlos Monden starred as antagonists.

Plot 
Oswaldo Beltran, a father, died tragically in a car accident, leaving his family (his widow, Dolores, his eldest daughter, Gabriela, and his youngest son, Vado) at the mercy of poverty and hunger. Over time, the three manage to get along without many amenities.

Cast 
 
Alejandra Ávalos as Gabrielita Beltrán
Chao as Gorka Sarachaga
Mariana Garza as Santa Robles
Otto Sirgo as Tasio Sarachaga
Saúl Lisazo as Alejandro Reyes
Talina Fernández as Mariana de Sarachaga
Rosita Arenas as Laura Alcaine
Macaria as Dolores de Beltrán
Miguel Ángel Ferriz as Adán Mejía
Humberto Dupeyrón as Jorge Vega
Carlos Monden as Lorenzo Bermúdez
Héctor Cruz Lara as Gonzalo "Chalo" Escobar
Gustavo Navarro as Pepe Ramírez
Daniela Leites as Irma Alcaide
Marisol Mijares as Ximena Sarachaga
Zully Keith as Dora Ramírez
Imperio Vargas as Bertha
Luis Couturier as Antonio Olvera
Alpha Acosta as Roxana
Jaime Puga as Comandante
María Clara Zurita as Chata
Justo Martínez as Gilberto Escobar
Alejandro Gaytán as Osvaldo "Vado" Beltrán
María Rebeca as Hilda
Martha Navarro as Elena de Robles
Tito Reséndiz as Mario Robles
Ricardo Lezama as Don Mike
Humberto Leyva as El Sonrisas
Paola Ochoa as Rebeca
Alejandro Mayén as Dr. Ricardo
Gonzalo Vega as Oswaldo Beltrán
Rosario Gálvez
Verónica Terán
Edith Kleiman
Jorge Pais
Monserrat Ontiveros
Alejandra Gollas
Alan Gutiérrez
Ginny Hoffman
Juan Felipe Preciado
Álvaro Carcaño Jr.
Lucía Paillés
Rodrigo Zurita
Sergio Acosta
Moisés Juan
Óscar Servin
Maleni Morales
Antonio Brillas
Guillermo Sauceda
Alejandro Calderón
Carlos Canto
Juan de la Loza
Óscar Narváez
Luis Cárdenas
Miguel Gómez Checa
Hernán Mendoza
Eva Calvo
Francisco Casasola
Ricardo Leal
Arturo Lapman
Horacio Vera

References

External links

1992 telenovelas
Mexican telenovelas
1992 Mexican television series debuts
1993 Mexican television series endings
Spanish-language telenovelas
Television shows set in Mexico
Televisa telenovelas